was a women's association football team that played in Division 1 of Japan's Nadeshiko League. 

The club was disbanded in 1996.

Results

Transition of team name
FC Kodaira: 1982 - 1988
Shinko Seiko FC Clair: 1989 - 1992
Tokyo Shidax LSC: 1993 - 1996

References

External links 
Japanese women's club teams

Women's football clubs in Japan
Football clubs in Tokyo
1976 establishments in Japan
1996 disestablishments in Japan
Association football clubs established in 1976
Association football clubs disestablished in 1996